Chanautey Gewog was a gewog (village block) of Tsirang District, Bhutan.

References

Former gewogs of Bhutan
Tsirang District